The Blue Bell  is a grade II listed building and former public house in Barton-upon-Humber, North Lincolnshire, England.

In 2016, the site was redeveloped into a housing complex named Blue Bell Court. This conversion project was awarded the Annual Award 2016 by Barton-upon-Humber Civic Society.

References 

Grade II listed pubs in Lincolnshire
Grade II listed buildings in North Lincolnshire
Barton-upon-Humber